Alavoneh (also Romanized as ‘Alāvoneh) is a village in Karkheh Rural District, Hamidiyeh District, Ahvaz County, Khuzestan Province, Iran. At the 2006 census, its population was 732, in 94 families.

References 

Populated places in Ahvaz County